Ted Chronopoulos (born September 16, 1972) is an American former soccer player. He spent three seasons in the Greek First Division, seven seasons in Major League Soccer, three in the USL First Division and one in Major Indoor Soccer League. He also earned one cap with the United States national team.

Playing

High school and college
Chronopoulos grew up in Rialto, California, graduating from Eisenhower High School in 1990. That fall, he entered California State University, San Bernardino, and spent two seasons with the Coyotes before transferring to San Diego State University for the 1993 season.

Greece
In 1993, Chronopoulos left San Diego State to sign with Greek First Division club Panionios. He spent three seasons in Greece, seeing time in forty-seven first team games.

MLS
In February 1996, the New England Revolution of Major League Soccer selected Chronopoulos in the fifth round (forty-fifth overall) of the 1996 Inaugural Draft. He was traded to the MetroStars on May 24, 2002. The Revs sent Chronopoulos, Andy Williams and Mamadou Diallo to the MetroStars for Daniel Hernandez, Diego Serna and Brian Kamler. He played eighteen games with the MetroStars before being put on waivers on November 5, 2002.

USL
Choronopolous signed with the Charleston Battery of the USL First Division on February 10, 2003. He spent three seasons with the Battery, earning second-team All-Star honors in 2003. That year, he also scored one of the Battery's three goals in its championship victory over the Minnesota Thunder.

MISL
On August 10, 2004, Chronopoulos signed with the Chicago Storm of Major Indoor Soccer League. While he was selected as team captain, he suffered from several injuries during the season. He retired from playing professionally in September 2005.

National team
Chronopoulos earned one cap with the U.S. national team, taking part in a 2-1 win over Israel on June 17, 1997. He came on for Jeff Agoos in the seventy-first minute.

Coaching
Throughout his playing career, Chronopoulos served as a trainer or coach for numerous youth teams. In 2005, he was also an assistant coach with the Charleston Battery. Chronopoulos also served as Director of Chivas USA youth academy. In 2013 he and Dan Calichman filed a lawsuit against Chivas USA arguing that they were fired because they were not Latino and did not speak Spanish.
With an USSF 'A' License, Chronopoulos is currently the Director of Soccer for The Pateadores, a premier youth soccer organization based in Southern California.

In August 2010, Teddy joined the New York Cosmos (2010) in the role of Director of The Cosmos Academy with a focus on developing world class youth talent.

External links
New England Revolution profile
MetroStars profile
Charleston Battery profile

References

Living people
1972 births
Sportspeople from Rialto, California
American soccer players
American expatriate soccer players
American people of Greek descent
United States men's international soccer players
Soccer players from California
San Diego State Aztecs men's soccer players
Panionios F.C. players
New England Revolution players
New York Red Bulls players
USL First Division players
Charleston Battery players
Chicago Storm (MISL) players
American soccer coaches
Major League Soccer players
USL First Division coaches
Super League Greece players
Major League Soccer All-Stars
A-League (1995–2004) players
People from Loma Linda, California
Association football defenders
Association football midfielders